Dinas Powys is the name of an electoral ward in the Vale of Glamorgan, Wales. It covers its namesake community of Dinas Powys and the neighbouring Michaelston-le-Pit and Leckwith to the north. The ward elects four county councillors to the Vale of Glamorgan Council.

According to the 2011 census the population of the ward was 7,799.

Election results
At the May 2017 County Council elections all four seats were won by the Conservative Party. One of the losing councillors was Plaid Cymru's Chris Franks, who had represented the ward since 2001 and had been leader of the Plaid Cymru group on the County Council.

Prior to May 2017 the ward was known as "The People’s Republic of Plaid", having been represented by three Plaid Cymru councillors and one Independent (Christopher Williams had been elected initially for Plaid Cymru but changed to Independent in 2014).

* = sitting councillor prior to the election

Plaid Cymru had held all four county council seats since 1995.

References

Vale of Glamorgan electoral wards
electoral ward